The 2017 Challenger Banque Nationale de Saguenay was a professional tennis tournament played on indoor hard courts. It was the 12th edition of the tournament and part of the 2017 ITF Women's Circuit, offering a total of $60,000 in prize money. It took place in Saguenay, Quebec, Canada between October 23 and October 29, 2017.

Singles main-draw entrants

Seeds

1 Rankings are as of October 16, 2017

Other entrants
The following players received wildcards into the singles main draw:
 Isabelle Boulais
 Leylah Annie Fernandez
 Catherine Leduc
 Charlotte Robillard-Millette

The following player entered the singles main draw with a protected ranking:
 Ysaline Bonaventure

The following players received entry from the qualifying draw:
 Elena Bovina
 Quinn Gleason
 Alexandra Stevenson
 Xu Shilin

Champions

Singles

 Gréta Arn def.  Bibiane Schoofs, 6–1, 6–2

Doubles

 Bianca Andreescu /  Carol Zhao def.  Francesca Di Lorenzo /  Erin Routliffe by walkover

External links
Official website

Challenger Banque Nationale de Saguenay
Challenger de Saguenay
Challenger Banque Nationale de Saguenay